Colorado's transportation consists of a network of highway, surface street, rail, and air options. While the public transportation system in Denver is much more complex and developed than other parts of the state, tourism and growth have led to extensive needs statewide.

Roads and highways

Overview
Colorado is a landlocked state, so ground and air transportation are the primary focus of the state. Also, due to low population density outside the Denver and Colorado Springs metropolitan areas, highways are the primary transportation method for most residents.

Interstate and U.S. Highways

The main north–south route in Colorado is Interstate 25 (I-25). The I-25 corridor follows the front range of the Colorado Rockies and connects Denver, Colorado Springs, Pueblo, Fort Collins, Greeley, Trinidad, and other small cities. I-70 crosses Colorado from west to east and is a primary viaduct for tourists and locals to visit mountain communities. When it was completed, the section of I-70 passing through Glenwood Canyon was the most expensive section of Interstate highway ever built in the United States with a total cost of $490 million for the  stretch.

Due to winter weather conditions, sections of I-70 are regularly closed during the winter and are expensive to maintain.

Interstates I-225 and I-270 provide connection through heavy traffic corridors in the Denver Area. I-76 connects the Denver area with I-80 in Nebraska to the northeast.

Highway Safety

In 2011, Colorado ranked among the five deadliest states for debris/litter–caused vehicle accidents per total number of registered vehicles and population size. Figures derived from the National Highway Traffic Safety Administration (NHTSA) show at least 16 persons in Colorado were killed each year in motor vehicle collisions with non-fixed objects, including debris, dumped litter, animals, and their carcasses.

In the United States, including Colorado, most civil aviation incidents are investigated by the National Transportation Safety Board (NTSB), as well as the Colorado Bureau of Investigation (CBI). When investigating an aviation disaster, NTSB investigators piece together evidence from the crash and determine the likely cause(s), whereas the CBI will also investigate if there is any involved criminal actions.

State Routes

Colorado maintains state highways for high-volume travel routes that do not qualify for federal funding.

Buses and mass transit

Denver's Regional Transportation District, known locally as RTD, is the largest public transportation system in Colorado. The RTD system provides bus, light rail, and commuter rail transportation services in the majority of the Denver-Aurora-Boulder Combined Statistical Area. Through its FasTracks initiative, RTD is working to rapidly build light rail and bus rapid transit.

Other transportation services exist throughout the state. Some systems, such as in Colorado Springs, focus on the local area. Other systems, such as that found on the Western Slope connecting Glenwood Springs, Aspen, and Carbondale offer regional connections. Intercity bus service is provided by a number of carriers including Burlington Trailways, Bustang, Express Arrow, and Greyhound Lines.

Denver and Colorado Springs are serviced by the FREX regional bus.
Fort Collins, Loveland, Berthoud, and Longmont are serviced by the FLEX regional bus.

Air transportation

Denver International Airport handles the majority of air traffic in Colorado and is the fifth busiest airport in the world. Colorado Springs Airport also handles commercial flights and offers service to national destinations. The majority of other airports in the state handle on regional or private aviation needs.

Centennial Airport, located in Arapahoe County, is one of the busiest general aviation airports in the country and primarily handles private and corporate traffic.

Rail transportation

The Union Pacific Central Corridor begins north of Denver, passing through the Moffat Tunnel at the Continental Divide.

Denver's Regional Transportation District operates a commuter rail and light rail system serving local transit needs.

Amtrak operates two long-distance passenger train routes through Colorado—the California Zephyr and Southwest Chief—as well as the Winter Park Express seasonal ski train. Front Range Passenger Rail service on the I-25 corridor between Fort Collins and Pueblo is under development.

See also
 Plug-in electric vehicles in Colorado

References